In mathematical optimization, the proximal operator is an operator associated with a proper, lower semi-continuous convex function  from a Hilbert space 

  
For any function in this class, the minimizer of the right-hand side above is unique, hence making the proximal operator well-defined. The proximal operator  is used in proximal gradient methods, which is frequently used in optimization algorithms associated with non-differentiable optimization problems such as total variation denoising.

Properties 
The  of a proper, lower semi-continuous convex function  enjoys several useful properties for optimization. 

This convergence may be weak if  is infinite dimensional.
 The proximal operator can be seen as a generalization of the projection operator. Indeed, in the specific case where  is the  0- indicator function   of a nonempty, closed, convex set  we have that
 
 showing that the proximity operator is indeed a generalisation of the projection operator. 

 A function is firmly non-expansive if  .
 The proximal operator of a function is related to the gradient of the Moreau envelope  of a function  by the following identity: .

Notes

References

Mathematical optimization

See also 
 Proximal gradient method

External links
 The Proximity Operator repository: a collection of proximity operators implemented in Matlab and Python.
 ProximalOperators.jl: a Julia package implementing proximal operators.
 ODL: a Python library for inverse problems that utilizes proximal operators.